Arcadia Publishing is an American publisher of neighborhood, local, and regional history of the United States in pictorial form. Arcadia Publishing also runs the History Press, which publishes text-driven books on American history and folklore.

History  

Arcadia Publishing was founded in Dover, New Hampshire, in 1993 by United Kingdom-based Tempus Publishing, but became independent after being acquired by its CEO in 2004. The corporate office is in Mount Pleasant, South Carolina.

It has a catalog of more than 12,000 titles, and italong with its subsidiary, The History Presspublishes 900 new titles every year.

Its formula for regional publishing is to use local writers or historians to write about their community using 180 to 240 black-and-white photographs with captions and introductory paragraphs in a 128-page book. The Images of America series is the company's largest product line. Other series include Images of Rail, Images of Sports, Images of Baseball, Black America, Postcard History, Campus History, Corporate History, Legendary Locals, Images of Modern America, and Then & Now.

In 2010, Arcadia became the first major publisher to print all of their books on Forest Stewardship Council (FSC) paper. All of the publisher's books are also printed and manufactured in South Carolina on American-made paper.

In May 2017, Arcadia acquired Palmetto Publishing Group, a Charleston-based self-publishing service that had been in business since 2015.

In 2018, Arcadia was acquired by Lezen, a new company owned by Lili and Michael Lynton.

In March 2019, Walter Isaacson became the editor-at-large and senior adviser for Arcadia Publishing, where he will be promoting books for the company as well as editing, new strategy development, and partnerships.

The History Press  

The History Press is a subsidiary publishing house, owned by Arcadia. Its books mainly deal with "narratives of local heroes, tragic losses, collections of homegrown recipes, historic mysteries, and everything in between." Some of their series include: American Legends (a series focused on local mythology, legends, and mysteries), Forgotten Tales (a line of books that catalogue near-forgotten stories), and Haunted America (paranormal history books that are written by local authors about ghost stories specific to cities across the US).

The History Press was originally a United States subsidiary of the United Kingdom-based publisher of the same name. In 2014, the US-based portion of The History Press was sold to Arcadia Publishing.

Acquisitions
In May 2019, Pelican Publishing Company was officially purchased by Arcadia Publishing.

In 2021, Arcadia acquired Commonwealth Editions from Applewood Books.

Distribution  

The books are printed in the United States. Arcadia handles its own sales and distribution with the following each accounting for one-third of the company's sales:
 Bookstore chains
 Independent bookstores, libraries, and museums
 Nontraditional outlets (like historical societies or hardware stores)

See also

References

External links

 
 Arcadia Publishing: Expands Distribution to Reach More Readers

Book publishing companies based in South Carolina
Publishing companies established in 1993
1993 establishments in New Hampshire
American companies established in 1993